The 2017 FIBA Europe Cup Final were the concluding games of the 2016–17 FIBA Europe Cup season. The Finals were played in a two-legged format, with the first leg being played on April 19 and the second one on April 26, 2017.

The first leg was played at Le Colisée in Chalon-sur-Saône, at the home court of Élan Chalon. The second leg was played at the Palais des Sports Maurice Thorez in Nanterre, at the home court of Nanterre 92.

Venue
The Le Colisée was the first leg venue as Élan Chalon venue. In the previous season Le Colisée hosted the 2016 FIBA Europe Cup Final Four. The stadium has a capacity of 5,000 people.

The Palais des Sports Maurice Thorez in Nanterre was the home venue of the second leg as the home court of Nanterre 92. The arena was built in 2015 and has a capacity for 3,000 people.

Road to the Finals

Note: In the table, the score of the finalist is given first (H = home; A = away).

First leg

Second leg

References

See also
2017 EuroLeague Final Four
2017 EuroCup Finals
2017 Basketball Champions League Final Four

2017
2016–17 FIBA Europe Cup
April 2017 sports events in Europe
2016–17 in French basketball
Chalon-sur-Saône
Nanterre
International basketball competitions hosted by France